La Chinita International Airport  is an airport serving Maracaibo, the capital of Zulia. It is located southwest of Maracaibo proper in the municipality of San Francisco. La Chinita is Venezuela's second most important airport in terms of passenger and aircraft movements, after Simón Bolívar International Airport near Caracas.

History
The airport opened on 16 November 1969, during the administration of President of Venezuela Rafael Caldera, to open a gateway to the western part of the country and to alleviate congestion from Simón Bolívar International Airport, which manages about half of the international flights in Venezuela. The earlier airport was Grano de Oro (1960 diagram)

Facilities
Runway 03L/21R length does not include a  paved overrun on the north end.

Airlines and destinations

Passenger

Cargo

Accidents and incidents
On 1 November 1971, Vickers Viscount YV-C-AMZ of Linea Aeropostal Venezolana crashed shortly after take-off. All four people on board were killed.
On March 5, 1991, Aeropostal Alas de Venezuela Flight 108 crashed in to a nearby mountain soon after takeoff, killing all 45 passenger and crew.

See also
Transport in Venezuela
List of airports in Venezuela

External links 

SkyVector - La Chinita
OurAirports - La Chinita
OpenStreetMap - La Chinita

References 

Airports in Venezuela
Buildings and structures in Maracaibo
1969 establishments in Venezuela